SIRIUS Left was Sirius Satellite Radio's liberal talk channel. It featured personalities such as Lynn Samuels, Bill Press, Alex Bennett, Mike Malloy, Ed Schultz, Thom Hartmann and Mark Thompson.  It was also one of the Sirius XM-owned channels to be exclusive to Sirius and not heard on XM (along with SIRIUS Hits 1.) In June 2008, Sirius Canada added the Sirius Left channel to its lineup.

After the Sirius XM merger, the co-owned America Left channel on XM Satellite Radio did not join the Sirius roster when most of the lineups were combined on November 12, 2008. Likewise, SIRIUS Left did not join the XM lineup. Instead, both channels were added to the online streaming services, and were accessible to online subscribers of both services including the iPhone and BlackBerry apps. The two channels merged to become Sirius XM Left May 4, 2011. And that channel was renamed SiriusXM Progress on July 22, 2013.  Thom Hartmann and Mark Thompson can still be heard on the channel, along with Stephanie Miller, Michelangelo Signorile and Ari Rabin Havt.

Political analyst Andy Ostroy has criticized Sirius Left and liberal talk radio in general in The Huffington Post. Ostroy disliked Sirius Left's three in-house hosts Alex Bennett, Lynn Samuels, and Mark Thompson. Bennett was described as "an ungracefully-aging hippie himself, [who] offers up more gratuitous profanity than intellectual political thought"; Samuels on "any random listen could be whining about anything meaningless"; while Thompson, although "a smart, passionate guy, has a program so mellow in tone that it can literally put you to sleep. His voice is so smooth and jazzy that he'd be much better off cuing up a Miles Davis album." Ostroy said that Sirius Left should have more "ass-kickers" on the network, like Randi Rhodes and Stephanie Miller.

References

External links
 

Sirius Satellite Radio channels
Radio stations disestablished in 2013